Touliang huanzhu ( tōu liáng huàn zhù) is a 4-character Chinese language term referring to the clandestine use of cheap construction materials in place of higher-quality materials to cut costs. The resultant shoddy construction may be referred to as a tofu-dreg project.

Example
The New Yorker reported that: 
In November, 2011, a former cook with no engineering experience was found to be building a high-speed railway bridge using a crew of unskilled migrant laborers who substituted crushed stones for cement in the foundation. In railway circles, the practice of substituting cheap materials for real ones was common enough to rate its own expression: touliang huanzhu—robbing the beams to put in the pillars.

See also
Wenzhou train collision
2008 Chinese milk scandal

References

Chinese-language idioms